Stanley Terence Prince (24 January 1927 – 20 October 2005) was an English footballer who represented Great Britain at the 1956 Summer Olympics. Prince played as an amateur for Walthamstow Avenue.

References

1927 births
2005 deaths
English footballers
Walthamstow Avenue F.C. players
Footballers at the 1956 Summer Olympics
Olympic footballers of Great Britain
Association football midfielders